Oh, Grow Up is an American sitcom that aired on ABC from September 22 to December 28, 1999.  Created by Alan Ball, the show was based on his 1991 one-act stage play Bachelor Holiday, written before he found success as a television writer. The series starred Stephen Dunham, David Alan Basche, and John Ducey as three former college roommates who share an apartment in Brooklyn.

Plot
Construction company owner Hunter Franklin and artist Norris Michelsky are old college roommates, who share an apartment in Brooklyn, but are nothing alike. When their other college roommate, attorney Ford Lowell, splits from his wife Suzanne after coming out, Hunter and Norris invite him to move in with them. In addition, ladies man Hunter discovers that an affair from years ago has produced a child, when 18-year-old art student Chloe makes contact with him. In addition, one of the more unique aspects of the show was a dog named Mom, whose barks were subtitled with captions.

Cast
 Stephen Dunham as Hunter Franklin
 David Alan Basche as Norris Michelsky
 John Ducey as Ford Lowell
 Rena Sofer as Suzanne Vandermeer
 Niesha Trout as Chloe Sheffield

Recurring
 Ed Marinaro as Sal, Hunter's boss

Notable guest stars
 Tom Cavanagh as Bruce ("Love Stinks")
 Wally Kurth as Lewis Morris Jr. ("Clods and Monsters")
 Dan Castellaneta as Sven Jorgensen ("Hunter's Metamorphosis")
 Jack Riley as Harry Tatham ("Himbo")
 Julia Campbell as Julie Sheffield, Chloe's mother ("The Parent Trap: Part I")

Production
The series was based on Ball's experiences in New York City in the early 1990s, before he had found success as a writer on other series such as Grace Under Fire and Cybill. ABC promoted the series as "a comedy for immature audiences", and initially scheduled Oh, Grow Up on Wednesday nights after Top 20 series The Drew Carey Show. The series, which debuted the same week as Ball's critically acclaimed film American Beauty was released, suffered from mixed reviews.

In November 1999, ABC announced that the series would move to Tuesday nights, between hits Spin City and Dharma & Greg. However, just after airing only three episodes in its new time slot, ABC cancelled the series on December 20, 1999, reportedly to make room for Who Wants to Be a Millionaire? on the same night. Only one more episode aired before ABC pulled the series, leaving two of the 13 episodes produced unaired. Despite the cancellation, the series placed at #61 for the overall season, with an average of 10.7 million viewers per week.

Episodes

References

External links

1990s American sitcoms
1999 American television series debuts
1999 American television series endings
1990s American LGBT-related comedy television series
American Broadcasting Company original programming
American LGBT-related sitcoms
English-language television shows
Gay-related television shows
Television series by 20th Century Fox Television
Television shows set in New York City